Hypselodoris ghardaqana is a species of sea slug, a dorid nudibranch, a marine gastropod mollusk in the family Chromodorididae.

Distribution
This species was described from the Red Sea. It has been reported from the Indian Ocean.

Description
This species is similar in colouration to Hypselodoris pulchella. It is suggested that this is a case of mimicry because the two species are not closely related.

References

Chromodorididae
Gastropods described in 1957